Hypoxis decumbens is a species of plant in the Hypoxidaceae, considered by some authors to be included within the Liliaceae or Amaryllidaceae. The species is widespread across South America, Central America, Mexico, and the West Indies.

References

Flora of North America
Flora of South America
decumbens
Plants described in 1759
Taxa named by Carl Linnaeus